Tingena idiogama is a species of moth in the family Oecophoridae. It is endemic to New Zealand and has been observed on the slopes of Mount Taranaki. Its preferred habitat is native subalpine scrub and adults are on the wing in January.

Taxonomy 
The species was first described by Edward Meyrick in 1924 using specimens collected at Mount Taranaki in January and named Borkhausenia idiogama. George Hudson discussed and illustrated this species in his 1928 book The butterflies and moths of New Zealand also under the same name. In 1988 J. S. Dugdale placed this species in the genus Tingena. The male lectotype specimen, collected at Mount Taranaki is held at the Natural History Museum, London.

Description

Meyrick described this species as follows:

Hudson stated that this species is variable in appearance in particular its discal markings on the forewings.

Distribution 
This species is endemic to New Zealand and has been found on the lower slopes of Mount Taranaki.

Behaviour 
The adults of this species are on the wing in January.

Habitat 
This species prefers subalpine scrub habitat.

References

Oecophoridae
Moths of New Zealand
Moths described in 1924
Endemic fauna of New Zealand
Taxa named by Edward Meyrick
Endemic moths of New Zealand